Ana Kiteer is the seventh studio album released by Egyptian singer Sherine. It was released by the recording company Nogoum Records in 2014. To many, this album has much meaning in the world. Even to Mrs. Abdel Wahab herself. Her song "Shokran Ya Shahm" (Thank you gentlemen) talks about how her husband cheated on her.

Track List 
 We Meen Ekhtar
 Da El Saytara
 Metakhda Men El Ayam
 Ya Layali
 Shokran Ya Shahm
 Kayneen
 Fe Leila
 Mesh Khayfa
 Ellet El-Nom
 Tagroba Mo2lema
 Koly Melkak
 Ana Kiteer

Nominations 
 Nominated for the Best World Music Award at the World Music Awards in 2014.

References 

Sherine albums
2014 albums
Arabic-language albums